Hayden Thompson-Stringer (born 29 December 1994 in Chatham, England) is an English professional rugby union footballer. He plays at prop for Stade Rochelais.

References

External links
Premiership Rugby Profile
Saracens F.C. Profile

1994 births
Living people
Bedford Blues players
English rugby union players
Rugby union players from Chatham, Kent
Saracens F.C. players
CA Brive players
Stade Rochelais players
Rugby union props